Aleksander Lubomirski may refer to:
Aleksander Dominik Lubomirski (1693–1720), Polish nobleman (szlachcic)
Aleksander Ignacy Lubomirski (1802–1893), Polish noble, financier and philanthropist
Aleksander Lubomirski (1751–1804), Polish nobleman, castellan of Kiev 1785–1790
Aleksander Michał Lubomirski (d. 1675), Polish noble (szlachcic)
Aleksander Michał Lubomirski (d. 1677) (1614–1677), Polish szlachcic

See also
Jerzy Aleksander Lubomirski (died 1735), Polish szlachcic
Józef Aleksander Lubomirski (1751–1817), Polish nobleman, castellan of Kiev 1790–1795